Freetown is the capital of Sierra Leone.

Freetown may also refer to:

Places
Freetown, Antigua and Barbuda
Freetown, Bahamas
Freetown (Belize House constituency), in the Belize District of Belize

United States
Freetown, Alabama
Freetown, Indiana
Freetown, Maryland, now Atholton
Freetown, Massachusetts
Freetown station
Freetown, New York
Freetown (East Hampton), New York
Freetown, Virginia

Other uses
Freetown (film), a 2015 American film
Freetown, a fictional town in the 2021 streaming series Star Wars: The Book of Boba Fett

See also 

 Free city (disambiguation)
Freetown Christiania, an intentional community and commune in Denmark
 Libreville, the capital city of Gabon